Enemy Nations is a real-time strategy game, created by Windward Studios. The game received very high rankings in video game magazines, but the publisher went out of business shortly after the game's release; the developer then sold the game exclusively from its website.

Plot 
The development of the Hyperspace-Drive triggers a gold rush-like colonization attempt by Earth governments, only to find that habitable (the game takes these as Earth-like) planets are either homeworlds for other sapient species, or colonies of early-evolved species.

Years of build-up and exploration bears fruit: A habitable, rich and lush world with no sentient race is found. However, almost every race intends to colonize it, and soon a full-scale Galactic war will erupt. To solve the bloodshed, the sapient races agree to a competition:

Every race would dispatch a Rocket Ship with a pre-determined size, mass and equipment, stocked with materials, personnel and equipment to create a city analogous of modern Earth technology and infrastructure. Then without interruption from outer space, the base-cities would engage in conflict, with the victor being granted the ownership of the planet. Of course, it is your duty to ensure a new world for your species to claim.

Development
Stores pre-ordered above 100,000 copies of Enemy Nations by January 29, 1997. The game was in development for 18 months.

Reception
According to its developer, sales of Enemy Nations surpassed 35,000 units by late 1998.

Home of the Underdogs - 9/10. "Enemy Nations is one of the best and most sophisticated real-time strategy games ever made...It's neither a simple action strategy game, nor is it a straightforward god game with token battle elements. Rather, it's an isometric strategy game which takes influences from half a dozen existing games and tries to blend them into something new, and in most aspects, succeeds admirably."

Legal Dispute
After the publisher Head Games went out of business, Windward Studios said Enemy Nations grossed more than $500,000, and hadn't paid Windward royalties. Windward took Head Games to arbitration and won. Activision acquired Head Games in the middle of the arbitration.

In 1999 Windward stated on their webpage that it had been nine weeks since the ruling and Activision still had not paid them.

Legacy
The game itself was released as strictly non-commercial and privately redistributable freeware on October 1, 2005.
Windward released the source code of the game in the beginning of 2006. The source code and data were released free by Windward Studios under the following limited license:

The source code is hosted since 2009 by the Enemy Nations Revival project and on Launchpad.net.

References

External links

1997 video games
Real-time strategy video games
Multiplayer online games
Multiplayer and single-player video games
Windows games
Windows-only games
Science fiction video games
Video games developed in the United States
Commercial video games with freely available source code
Freeware games